Flupirtine is an aminopyridine that functions as a centrally acting non-opioid analgesic that was originally used as an analgesic for acute and chronic pain but in 2013 due to issues with liver toxicity, the European Medicines Agency restricted its use to acute pain, for no more than two weeks, and only for people who cannot use other painkillers. In March 2018, marketing authorisations for flupirtine were withdrawn following a European Medicines Agency recommendation based on the finding that the restrictions introduced in 2013 had not been sufficiently followed in clinical practice, and cases of serious liver injury still occurred including liver failure.

Flupirtine is a selective neuronal potassium channel opener (SNEPCO) that also has NMDA receptor antagonist and GABAA receptor modulatory properties.

It first became available in Europe in 1984 under the brand name Katadolon and after it went off patent many generic brands were introduced.

Uses
Flupirtine is used as an analgesic for acute pain, in moderate-to-severe cases. Its muscle relaxant properties make it popular for back pain and other orthopaedic uses, but it is also used for migraines, in oncology, postoperative care, and gynaecology.

In 2013 due to issues with liver toxicity, the European Medicines Agency restricted its use to acute pain, for no more than two weeks, and only for people who cannot use other painkillers.

Side effects
The most serious side effect is frequent hepatotoxicity which prompted regulatory agencies to issue several warnings and restrictions.

Flupirtine is devoid of negative psychological or motor function effects, or effects on reproductive function.

Abuse and dependence
Although some studies have reported flupirtine has no addictive properties, there was suggestion that it may possess some abuse potential and liability. There were at least two registered cases of flupirtine abuse. Drug tolerance does not develop in most cases, but has individually occurred.

Mechanism of action
Flupirtine is a selective neuronal potassium channel opener that also has indirect NMDA receptor antagonist and GABAA receptor modulatory properties.

History
Flupirtine was discovered and developed between the 1970s and the 1990s by Chemiewerk Homburg in Frankfurt am Main, Germany, which became Degussa Pharma Group and then through mergers, ASTA Pharma and Asta Medica. Retigabine, in which the pyridine group in flupirtine is replaced with a phenyl group, was discovered as part of the same program and has a similar mechanism of action.

It was approved for the treatment of pain in 1984 in Europe under the brand name Katadolon.

As of 2013 it was used in 11 member countries: Bulgaria, Estonia, Germany, Hungary, Italy, Latvia, Lithuania, Poland, Portugal, Romania and Slovak Republic. Many generics entered the European market around 2011.

It was never introduced to the United States market for any indication but in 2008, Adeona Pharmaceuticals, Inc. (now called Synthetic Biologics, Inc.) obtained an option to license issued and patent pending applications relating to flupirtine's use in the treatment of ophthalmic indications, particularly retinitis pigmentosa.

In 2010 retigabine was approved by the FDA as an anticonvulsant for the treatment of refractory partial-onset seizures in treatment-experienced patients.

As of 2016 it is marketed under many brand names, including Efiret, Flupigil, Flupirtin, Flupirtina, Flupirtine, Flupizen, Fluproxy, Katadolon, Metanor, Trancolong, and Zentiva.

Research
Flupirtine has been noted for its neuroprotective properties, and has been investigated for possible use in Creutzfeldt–Jakob disease, Alzheimer's disease, and multiple sclerosis. It has also been proposed as a possible treatment for Batten disease.

Flupirtine underwent a clinical trial as a treatment for multiple sclerosis and fibromyalgia. Flupirtine showed promise for fibromyalgia due to its different action than the three approved by U.S. FDA drugs: pregabalin, milnacipran, and duloxetine. Additionally, there are case reports regarding flupirtine as a treatment for fibromyalgia. Adeona Pharmaceuticals (now called Synthetic Biologics) sub-licensed its patents for using flupirtine for fibromyalgia to Meda AB in May 2010.

References

Aminopyridines
Carbamates
Potassium channel openers
Fluoroarenes
GABAA receptor positive allosteric modulators
NMDA receptor antagonists